ESDI may refer to:

 ESDi School of Design, at University Ramon Llull, Barcelona, Spain
 Enhanced Small Disk Interface, a computer disk interface
 European Security and Defence Identity, a European initiative in NATO overseen by the Western European Union
 Escola Superior de Desenho Industrial, at Rio de Janeiro State University, Brazil